Hartford Township is an inactive township in Pike County, in the U.S. state of Missouri.

Hartford Township most likely was named after Hertford, England, perhaps via another an American town of the same name.

References

Townships in Missouri
Townships in Pike County, Missouri